In the 1977 Intertoto Cup no knock-out rounds were contested, and therefore no winner was declared.

Group stage
The teams were divided into ten groups of four teams each.

Group 1

Group 2

Group 3

Group 4

Group 5

Group 6

Group 7

Group 8

Group 9

Group 10

See also
 1977–78 European Cup
 1977–78 UEFA Cup Winners' Cup
 1977–78 UEFA Cup

External links
  by Pawel Mogielnicki

1977
4